The 2010–11 Four Hills Tournament was held at the four traditional venues of Oberstdorf, Garmisch-Partenkirchen, Innsbruck and Bischofshofen, located in Germany and Austria, between 28 December 2010 and 6 January 2011.

Overall standings

Oberstdorf
 HS 137 Schattenbergschanze, Germany
29 December 2010

Garmisch-Partenkirchen
 HS 140 Große Olympiaschanze, Germany
1 January 2011
Due to heavy wind there was no second jump held in this competition.

Innsbruck
 HS 130 Bergiselschanze, Austria
3 January 2011

Bischofshofen
 HS 140 Paul-Ausserleitner-Schanze, Austria
6 January 2011

See also
2010–11 FIS Ski Jumping World Cup

References

External links
Official website 

Four Hills Tournament
Four Hills Tournament, 2010-11
Four Hills Tournament, 2010-11
2010 in German sport
2011 in German sport
2011 in Austrian sport